Wilson Heriberto Méndez (born 25 May 1982 in Presidente Franco, Paraguay) is a Paraguayan footballer.

Teams
  Cerro Porteño PF 2003–2004
  3 de Febrero 2005–2008
  Sportivo Luqueño 2009
  12 de Octubre 2009
  Curicó Unido 2010–2012
  3 de Febrero 2013–2014
  Cerro Porteño PF 2015

References

External links
 
 

1982 births
Living people
Paraguayan footballers
Paraguayan expatriate footballers
Sportivo Luqueño players
12 de Octubre Football Club players
Curicó Unido footballers
Expatriate footballers in Chile
Cerro Porteño (Presidente Franco) footballers
Association footballers not categorized by position